The following highways are numbered 798:

United States
 
 
 
 
Territories
  Puerto Rico Highway 798

Former
  Florida State Road 798